The Great White Heron National Wildlife Refuge is part of the United States National Wildlife Refuge System, located in a region known as the 'Backcountry', which reaches from north of Marathon to north of Key West. It is along the north side of the Keys in that area that border the Gulf of Mexico. The 130,187 acre (527 km2) refuge (6,207 acres (25 km2) of it land, 123,980 (502 km2) water) was established on October 27, 1938, as a haven for great white herons, migratory birds, and other wildlife Approximately 1,900 acres (8 km2) are designated as a National Wilderness Area. The refuge is administered as part of the National Key Deer Refuge.

Flora
The islands are covered mostly with mangroves, though some of the larger islands contain pine rockland and tropical hardwood hammock habitats.

Fauna
Hawksbill sea turtles have been known to feed in the refuge. Also, loggerhead and green sea turtles nest here.

External links
 Great White Heron National Wildlife Refuge

National Wildlife Refuges in Monroe County, Florida
Florida Keys
Protected areas established in 1938
Wetlands of Florida
Landforms of Monroe County, Florida
1938 establishments in Florida